Hezar Jarib Boulevard is a boulevard in southern Isfahan city, Isfahan Province, Iran. This boulevard has historically been Isfahan's southern exit towards Shiraz. University of Isfahan is located along most of the western side of this boulevard.

Streets in Isfahan